The 2022 FIBA Under-18 Americas Championship was an international under-18 basketball tournament that was  held from 6 to 12 June 2022 in Tijuana, Baja California, Mexico. The twelfth edition of the biennial competition, this is also the qualifying tournament for FIBA Americas in the 2023 FIBA Under-19 Basketball World Cup in Hungary.

Hosts selection
On 9 May 2022, FIBA Americas has decided to grant Mexico the hosting rights for the FIBA U18 Americas Men's Championship. The city of Tijuana will host the event which will take place from June 6 to 12. The tournament will be played again after the last edition held in 2018, since the 2020 event was canceled due to the COVID-19 pandemic. This will be the first time that Mexico will host the continental under-18 tournament.

Participating teams 
 North America:
 
  
 Central America/Caribbean: (2017 Central American/Caribbean U17 Championship in Mexicali, Mexico - 8–12 December 2021)
 
  (Hosts)
 
 South America: (2022 South American U18 Championship in Caracas, Venezuela - 21–26 March 2022)

Preliminary round
The draw was held on 16 May 2022 in FIBA Americas Regional Office in San Juan, Puerto Rico.

All times are local (UTC-7).

Group A

Group B

Knockout stage

Bracket

Quarterfinals

5–8th place semifinals

Semifinals

Seventh place game

Fifth place game

Third place game

Final

Statistics and awards

Awards

All Tournament Team
 Dylan Bordon
 Vasean Allette
 Reynan dos Santos
 Cam Whitmore
 Kel'el Ware

Final ranking

References

FIBA Americas Under-18 Championship
2022 in basketball
2021–22 in North American basketball
2021–22 in South American basketball
June 2022 sports events in Mexico
2022 in Mexican sports
International basketball competitions hosted by Mexico